Yvonne Lewis Holley (born August 12, 1952) is an American politician who served as the North Carolina state representative for the 38th district from 2013 to 2021. A member of the Democratic Party, her district consisted of part of Wake County.
She was the Democratic nominee for lieutenant governor of North Carolina in the 2020 North Carolina lieutenant gubernatorial election, which she narrowly lost to Mark Robinson.

Early life and education
Holley is the daughter of Raleigh broadcast personality J.D. Lewis of WRAL-TV. She attended William G. Enloe High School and graduated from Howard University, with a B.A. in political science and government in 1974.

Career
Before her career as a state legislator, she worked for the North Carolina Department of Administration, division of purchase and contract, as a procurement and contract specialist. In 2020, governor Roy Cooper appointed Holley to the Andrea Harris social, economic, environmental, and health equity task force.

2020 campaign for lieutenant governor

Holley unsuccessfully ran for lieutenant governor of North Carolina in the 2020 election. She placed first in the Democratic primary on March 3, 2020, but with less than the 30 percent required to avoid the possibility of a runoff. The second-place finisher, Terry Van Duyn, declined to call for a runoff, however, making Holley the Democratic nominee.

Holley campaigned on what she called an Affordable Living Initiative (ALI), which would bring together "public/private partnerships, non-profits, urban and rural governments, legislators, environmentalists, homebuilders, and everyday citizens to help solve some of the problems that have become critical needs in communities across NC. ALI will focus on the following: attainable housing; access to affordable and healthy food; jobs (living wages, entrepreneurial, small business, and workforce development); and transportation."

Holley lost the general election to the Republican candidate, Mark Robinson, 51%-48%.

References

External links

Representative Yvonne Lewis Holley government website
Holley for Lt. Governor campaign website

|-

1952 births
21st-century American politicians
21st-century American women politicians
Living people
Democratic Party members of the North Carolina House of Representatives
William G. Enloe High School alumni
Howard University alumni
Women state legislators in North Carolina
African-American people in North Carolina politics
African-American women in politics
21st-century African-American women
21st-century African-American politicians
20th-century African-American people
20th-century African-American women